The National Board for Consumer Disputes (ARN) is a Swedish government agency that answers to the Ministry of Finance. The agency is headquartered in Stockholm.  Its main task is to issue non-binding recommendations on the resolution of disputes between consumers and business operators. A person can, free of charge, file complaints against a company. If the company does not follow the recommendation from ARN, the consumer has the possibility to take the matter to court.

See also
Government agencies in Sweden.

References

External links
 National Board for Consumer Disputes - Official site
Svarta listan (Black list) – List of companies which do not follow ARN recommendations- the list is published by the magazine Råd & Rön 

National Board for Consumer Disputes
Economy of Sweden
Society of Sweden
Consumer rights agencies